The American Culinary Federation (ACF) was established in 1929 in New York City and is the largest professional chefs' organization in North America. It was the progeny of the combined visions of three chefs' associations in New York City, the Société Culinaire Philanthropique, the Vatel Club and the Chefs de Cuisine Association of America.

ACF, now based in St. Augustine, Florida, comprises more than 17,500 members in over 150 chapters across the United States, and is known as the authority on cooking in America. Its mission is to make a positive difference for culinarians through education, apprenticeship and certification, while creating a fraternal bond of respect and integrity among culinarians everywhere. One of ACF's defining historical moments remains the ACF-led initiative that resulted in the upgrade of the definition of chef from domestic to professional in 1976.  The ACF is a member of the World Association of Chefs Societies.

Today, ACF is the leader in offering educational resources, training, apprenticeship, competitions and programmatic accreditation designed to enhance professional growth for all current and future chefs and pastry chefs. In addition, ACF operates the most comprehensive culinary certification program in the world. ACF is home to ACF Culinary Team USA, the official representative for the United States in major international competitions. ACF also publishes The National Culinary Review, a bi-monthly print and digital magazine featuring articles on food, drink and menu trends, product application, management and lifestyle issues, recipes and professional development.

Education 
Through the American Culinary Federation Educational Foundation (ACFEF), ACF offers accreditation of secondary and post-secondary culinary education programs to ensure these programs meet the highest standards of education and professionalism. ACF-accredited culinary programs can be found across the United States as well as in Guam, Puerto Rico, Bermuda, Philippines, Bulgaria, Italy, Peru, Russia, and Switzerland.

In addition to accrediting education programs, ACF also oversees apprenticeship programs that combine on-the-job training and classroom instruction for future chefs. ACF assists establishments in setting up their own apprenticeship programs for students and has created a set of national apprenticeship guidelines and standards that are registered with the U.S. Department of Labor. In 2012, the ACF apprenticeship program received the 21st Century Registered Trailblazers and Innovators Award by the U.S. Department of Labor for its partnership with the U.S. Army.

Certification 
ACF offers 16 different professional certifications for chefs and culinary educators. Certification levels are based on a chef's educational and work experience. Culinary students may earn a basic level of certification through an ACF-accredited educational program or apprenticeship. Higher levels of certification are achieved by passing written and practical exams and certification is maintained through earning continuing education hours. Continuing education hours are offered at ACF events such as local chapter meetings, regional conferences, the annual National Convention, or through the ACF Online Learning Center.

The highest level of certification that can be reached is Certified Master Chef (CMC). There are only 68 people in the world that currently hold this distinction. The practical exam for the CMC level is held every other year and is widely considered to be one of the most difficult examinations on Earth. The most recent CMC exam was held in March 2019, with five candidates participating and only one passing the exam to earn the title of Certified Master Chef.

Culinary competitions
Culinary Competitions are a vital and evolving branch of the American Culinary Federation. Some competitions are single events taking place at individual ACF chapters, while other student and professional competitions that include individual and team events engage in a rigorous qualifying process that begins at the local ACF chapter level, advances at the ACF Regional Conferences and culminates with the finals at the ACF National Convention. Regardless of the level, the purpose is to continually raise the standards of culinary excellence in the United States while promoting camaraderie and educational opportunities among culinary professionals.

Some of the many ACF Culinary competitions include Chef of the Year, Pastry Chef of the Year, and Student Chef of the Year. These awards recognize chefs or students who have displayed a passion for the craft, a high level of professionalism, depth of knowledge, and a strong culinary skill set.

Advocacy and philanthropy

Scholarships 
The American Culinary Federation Education Foundation (ACFEF) provides scholarships for culinary students participating in apprenticeship programs, certificate programs, and post-secondary degree programs. Additionally, professional development grants are awarded on a competitive basis to exemplary working culinary professionals who wish to update their skills through continuing education.

The Chef & Child Foundation 
Founded in 1989, The Chef & Child Foundation seeks to "foster, promote, encourage and stimulate an awareness of proper nutrition in preschool and elementary school children", as well as fight against childhood obesity. Children benefit from the financial support which the foundation gives to other organizations which support childhood nutrition and obesity causes.  They also support a yearly Chef & Child Day, where the ACF chapters from across the United States participate in local and national events to support children's causes.

Disaster Relief Fund 
Funds from the ACFEF Disaster Relief Fund are available to assist ACF members, schools with ACFEF programmatic accreditation and their students, communities and individuals affected by catastrophic events and natural disasters. The fund aims to lift the financial burden of those without food, shelter, power or employment in the wake of a disaster.

Notable members 

 Cat Cora, HHOF
 Patrick O'Connell, HHOF
 Thomas Keller, HHOF
 Paul Prudhomme, HAAC, HHOF

ACF Culinary Team USA

ACF Culinary Team USA, a program of the American Culinary Federation (ACF), is the official representative team of the United States in major national and international culinary competitions. ACF Culinary Team USA comprises one national team of six members, two regional teams of five members each, and a youth team of five members less than 23 years old. The regional teams, considered a training ground for the national team, work with and assist the national team when they are not competing. ACF Culinary Team USA competes in many competitions including three major international culinary competitions: International Exhibition of Culinary Art (IKA) also known as the "Culinary Olympics", The American Culinary Classic, and Culinary World Cup.

List of ACF past national presidents
 2017–2020 Stafford DeCambra, CEC, AAC
 2013–2017: Thomas Macrina, CEC, CCA, AAC
 Michael Ty, CEC, AAC
 John Kacala, CMC, CCE, AAC
 Edward G. Leonard, CMC, AAC
 Noel Cullen, CMC, AAC
 Reimund Pitz, CEC, CCE, AAC
 Tim Ryan, CMC, AAC
 John Folse, CEC, AAC
 Michael Ty, CEC, AAC
 Keith Keogh, CEC, AAC
 Jack F. Braun, CEC, AAC
 Baron H. Galand, CEC, AAC
 Ferdinand E. Metz, CMC, AAC
 Richard Bosnjak, CEC, AAC
 Amato Ferrero, AAC
 Jack L. Sullivan, AAC
 John Bandera, CEC, AAC
 Willy Rossel, AAC
 C. Orby Anderson, CEC, AAC, HOF
 Peter Berrini
 Eugene Ertle
 Pierre Berard
 Paul Laesecke, AAC
 Charles Scotto

Notes

Works cited
American Culinary Federation, (2015) "ACF Culinary Competitions ...The Ultimate Challenge" Retrieved on April 6, 2007
American Culinary Federation, (2015) "American Culinary Chef & Child Foundation" Retrieved on May 27, 2015
American Culinary Federation, (2015) "Office of the President" Retrieved on May 27, 2015
Leonard, Edward G., American Culinary Federation’s Guide to Culinary Competitions. New York: Wiley, 2005
Michael Baskette and Brad Barnes., The American Culinary Federation's Guide to Culinary Certification. New York: Wiley, 2005

External links
 
 
 We Are Chefs, the Voice of the ACF
 ACF Culinary Competitions Calendar
 American Culinary Federation Chef & Child Foundation

Professional associations based in the United States
Culinary professional associations
Organizations established in 1929